The Vadagam State was a 5th Class princely state belonging to the Mahi Kantha Agency of the Bombay Presidency during the era of the British Raj. It had its capital in Vadgam taluk, Banaskantha district of present-day Gujarat State. Wadagam State's last ruler signed the accession to join the Indian Union in 1948.

History
Wadagam state was founded by Kumar Shri Keshavdasji Rajsinhji of Ranasan, a scion of the family of Ranasan and the former Raos of Chandravati.

Rulers
The rulers of Wadagam State bore the title 'Thakur'.

.... – ....               Keshavdasji Rajsinhji
.... – ....
.... – ....               Umedsinhji
.... – ....               Gulabsimhji Umedsinhji
.... – ....
.... – ....               Rajsinhi
.... – ....
9 Feb 1848 – ....         Kesrisinhji Pahadji                (b. 1821 – d. ....)
12 Feb 1920 – ....        Gopalsinhji Kesrisinhji
14 Jan 1929 – 1947        Vakhatsimhji                       (b. 1918)

See also
List of Rajput dynasties and states
Mahi Kantha Agency

References

Banaskantha district
Princely states of Gujarat
1948 disestablishments in India
Rajputs